Carpathonesticus paraavrigensis  is a species of araneomorph spider of the family Nesticidae. It occurs in Romania, where it was discovered in a narrow gorge, on the overhanging side.

Description
No male specimens have yet been described.
Female specimens resemble Carpathonesticus avrigensis, from which it can be distinguished by the epigyne. The colouring and patterning is similar to that of other Carpathonesticus species. The prosoma has a length of 2.6 mm; the full body-length is 6.2 mm.

Original publication

References 

Nesticidae
Spiders described in 1982
Spiders of Europe